Milton C. Handler (1903 – November 10, 1998) was an American lawyer and professor of law. He was considered a "leading antitrust expert and drafter of some of the nation's best-known laws."

Early life and education
Born in the Bronx in 1903, he was the youngest of seven children. After his father died when he was 2, they moved to Brooklyn. He graduated from Columbia College in 1923, originally thinking of teaching literature. He graduated from Columbia Law School in 1926 with top honors. He clerked for Justice Harlan Fiske Stone of the Supreme Court for one year.

Career
Handler taught at Columbia University Law School for 45 years. His tenure began after he was invited to teach at summer session. When he left, he had the longest tenure in the history of the school.

He was President Franklin D. Roosevelt's chief adviser on antitrust matters, served as the first general counsel to the National Labor Relations Board. He helped draft several landmark statutes such as the Federal Food, Drug and Cosmetic Act of 1938, the National Labor Relations Act and the G.I. Bill of Rights.

In the 1950s, he became a partner in the New York law firm, Kaye, Scholer, Fierman, Hays & Handler where he represented corporations such as Xerox, PepsiCo, the American Tobacco Company and Texaco.

Personal life
Handler married Marion Winter Kahn in 1931, who died in 1953. He married second wife Miriam Adler in 1955 (she predeceased him in 1997). He is survived by his daughter Carole E. Handler and two granddaughters, Alisa Marion Schoenbach and Ilana Abigail Schoenbach.

See also 
List of law clerks of the Supreme Court of the United States (Seat 9)

References

1903 births
1998 deaths
American legal scholars
Columbia Law School alumni
Columbia Law School faculty
Kaye Scholer partners
Law clerks of Harlan F. Stone
Law clerks of the Supreme Court of the United States
People from the Bronx
Antitrust lawyers
20th-century American lawyers
Columbia College (New York) alumni